Frank Jeske (6 February 1960 – 27 August 1994) was a German footballer.

During the 1986–87 UEFA Cup campaign, Jeske made 3 appearances for BSG Stahl Brandenberg and scored the match-winning goal against Coleraine in the first round.

Jeske, who made numerous appearances in the DDR-Oberliga during his career prior to German reunification, died in 1994 as a passenger in a car accident on the way home after a match.

References 

1960 births
1994 deaths
People from Ostprignitz-Ruppin
Road incident deaths in Germany
East German footballers
German footballers
DDR-Oberliga players
Association football forwards
Footballers from Brandenburg